The 2004 Tour de Romandie (58th Edition) cycling road race started on 27 April and finished on 2 May in Switzerland. It was won by Tyler Hamilton.

Stages

Prologue
28 April 2010 – Genève to Genève,  (ITT)

Stage 1
29 April 2010 – Yverdon-les-Bains to Yverdon-les-Bains,

Stage 2
30 April 2010 – Romont to Romont,

Stage 3
1 May 2010 – Romont to Morgins,

Stage 4
2 May 2010 – Sion to  Sion,

Stage 5
3 May 2010 – Lausanne to Lausanne, (ITT)

Classification Leadership

See also 
 2004 in road cycling
 UCI Pro Tour

References

Tour de Romandie
Tour de Romandie
2004 in Swiss sport